The Hon. Frederick Walpole (18 September 1822 – 1 April 1876), was a British naval commander and Conservative politician.

Background
Walpole was a younger son of Horatio Walpole, 3rd Earl of Orford, and Mary, daughter of William Augustus Fawkener.

Political career
Walpole was returned to Parliament as one of two representatives for Norfolk North in 1868, a seat he held until his death eight years later. He was also a Commander in the Royal Navy.

Family
Walpole married his second cousin Laura Sophia Frances, daughter of Francis Walpole and Elizabeth Knight, in 1852. They had several children, including Robert Walpole, who succeeded as fifth Earl of Orford in 1894. Walpole died in April 1876, aged 53. His wife survived him by 25 years and died in January 1901.

See also

References

External links 
 
 

1822 births
1876 deaths
Younger sons of earls
Conservative Party (UK) MPs for English constituencies
UK MPs 1868–1874
UK MPs 1874–1880
Frederick